The White Caravan is a 1963 Soviet black-and-white drama directed by Tamaz Meliava and Eldar Shengelaya. It was entered into the 1964 Cannes Film Festival. In April 2019, a restored version of the film was selected to be shown in the Cannes Classics section at the 2019 Cannes Film Festival.

Cast
 Imedo Kakhiani as Gela
 Ariadna Shengelaya as Maria
 Giorgi Kikadze as Vajia
 Spartak Bagashvili as Martia
 N. Kalapidini as Petro
 Merab Eliozishvili as Balta
 Kote Toloraya as Siata
 Dodo Abashidze as Driver
 Gogutsa Kuprashvili as Kivana
 I. Taralashvili as Sero
 V. Donguzashvili as Glakho

References

External links

1960s Russian-language films
1963 drama films
1963 films
Soviet black-and-white films
Films directed by Tamaz Meliava
Films directed by Eldar Shengelaia
Kartuli Pilmi films
Soviet drama films